British Railways (BR), which from 1965 traded as British Rail, was a state-owned company that operated most of the overground rail transport in Great Britain from 1948 to 1997. It was formed from the nationalisation of the Big Four British railway companies, and was privatised in stages between 1994 and 1997. Originally a trading brand of the Railway Executive of the British Transport Commission, it became an independent statutory corporation in January 1963, when it was formally renamed the British Railways Board.

The period of nationalisation saw sweeping changes in the railway. A process of dieselisation and electrification took place. By 1968 steam locomotives had been entirely replaced by diesel and electric traction, except for the Vale of Rheidol Railway (a narrow-gauge tourist line). Passengers replaced freight as the main source of business, and one-third of the network was closed by the Beeching cuts of the 1960s in an effort to reduce rail subsidies.

On privatisation, responsibility for track, signalling and stations was transferred to Railtrack (later brought under public control as Network Rail), with services run by train operating companies. The British Rail Double Arrow logo, known by many as "the arrow of indecision", remains in place and is now employed as a generic symbol on street signs in Great Britain denoting railway stations.

History

Nationalisation in 1948 

The rail transport system in Great Britain developed during the 19th century. After the grouping of 1923 under the Railways Act 1921, there were four large railway companies, each dominating its own geographic area: the Great Western Railway (GWR), the London, Midland and Scottish Railway (LMS), the London and North Eastern Railway (LNER) and the Southern Railway (SR). During World War I, the railways were under state control, which continued until 1921. Complete nationalisation had been considered, and the Railways Act 1921 is sometimes considered as a precursor to that, but the concept was rejected. Nationalisation was subsequently carried out after World War II, under the Transport Act 1947. This Act made provision for the nationalisation of the network as part of a policy of nationalising public services by Clement Attlee's Labour Government. British Railways came into existence as the business name of the Railway Executive of the British Transport Commission (BTC) on 1 January 1948 when it took over the assets of the Big Four.

There were also joint railways between the Big Four and a few light railways to consider (see list of constituents of British Railways). Excluded from nationalisation were industrial lines like the Oxfordshire Ironstone Railway. The London Underground – publicly owned since 1933 – was also nationalised, becoming the London Transport Executive of the British Transport Commission. The Bicester Military Railway was already run by the government. The electric Liverpool Overhead Railway was also excluded from nationalisation.

The Railway Executive was conscious that some lines on the (then very dense) network were unprofitable and hard to justify socially, and a programme of closures began almost immediately after nationalisation. However, the general financial position of BR became gradually poorer until an operating loss was recorded in 1955. The Executive itself had been abolished in 1953 by the Conservative government, and control of BR transferred to the parent Commission. Other changes to the British Transport Commission at the same time included the return of road haulage to the private sector; however, BR retained its own (smaller) inhouse road haulage service.

1955 Modernisation Plan 

The report, latterly known as the "Modernisation Plan", was published in January 1955. It was intended to bring the railway system into the 20th century. A government White Paper produced in 1956 stated that modernisation would help eliminate BR's financial deficit by 1962, but the figures in both this and the original plan were produced for political reasons and not based on detailed analysis. The aim was to increase speed, reliability, safety, and line capacity through a series of measures that would make services more attractive to passengers and freight operators, thus recovering traffic lost to the roads. Important areas included:
 Electrification of principal main lines, in the Eastern Region, Kent, Birmingham to Liverpool/Manchester and Central Scotland
 Large-scale dieselisation to replace steam locomotives
 New passenger and freight rolling stock
 Resignalling and track renewals
 Modern marshalling yards
 The closure of an unspecified but relatively small number of lines

The government appeared to endorse the 1955 programme (costing £1.2 billion), but did so largely for political reasons. This included the withdrawal of steam traction and its replacement by diesel (and some electric) locomotives. Not all modernisations would be effective at reducing costs. The dieselisation programme gave contracts primarily to British suppliers, who had limited experience of diesel locomotive manufacture, and rushed commissioning based on an expectation of rapid electrification; this resulted in numbers of locomotives with poor designs and a lack of standardisation. At the same time, containerised freight was being developed. The marshalling yard building programme was a failure, being based on a belief in the continued viability of wagon-load traffic in the face of increasingly effective road competition, and lacking effective forward planning or realistic assessments of future freight. A 2002 documentary broadcast on BBC Radio 4 blamed the 1950s decisions for the "beleaguered" condition of the railway system at that time.

The Beeching reports 

During the late 1950s, railway finances continued to worsen; whilst passenger numbers grew after restoring many services reduced during the war, and in 1959 the government stepped in, limiting the amount the BTC could spend without ministerial authority. A White Paper proposing reorganisation was published in the following year, and a new structure was brought into effect by the Transport Act 1962. This abolished the commission and replaced it by several separate boards. These included a British Railways Board, which took over on 1 January 1963.

Following semi-secret discussions on railway finances by the government-appointed Stedeford Committee in 1961, one of its members, Dr Richard Beeching, was offered the post of chairing the BTC while it lasted and then became the first Chairman of the British Railways Board.

A major traffic census in April 1961, which lasted one week, was used in the compilation of a report on the future of the network. This report—The Reshaping of British Railways—was published by the BRB in March 1963. The proposals, which became known as the Beeching cuts, were dramatic. A third of all passenger services and more than 4,000 of the 7,000 stations would close. Beeching, who is thought to have been the author of most of the report, set out some dire figures. One third of the network was carrying just 1% of the traffic. Of the 18,000 passenger coaches, 6,000 were said to be used only 18 times a year or less. Although maintaining them cost between £3million and £4million a year, they earned only about £0.5million.

Most of the closures were carried out between 1963 and 1970 (including some which were not listed in the report), while other suggested closures were not carried out. The closures were heavily criticised at the time. A small number of stations and lines closed under the Beeching programme have been reopened, with further reopenings proposed.

A second Beeching report, "The Development of the Major Trunk Routes", followed in 1965. This did not recommend closures as such but outlined a "network for development". The fate of the rest of the network was not discussed in the report.

Post-Beeching 
The basis for calculating passenger fares changed in 1964. In future, fares on some routes—such as rural, holiday and commuter services—would be set at a higher level than on other routes; previously, fares had been calculated using a simple rate for the distance travelled, which at the time was 3d per mile second class, and 4½d per mile first class (equivalent to £ and £ respectively, in ).

In 1966, a "Whites only" recruitment policy for guards at Euston station was dropped after the case of Asquith Xavier, a migrant from Dominica, who had been refused promotion on those grounds, was raised in Parliament and taken up by the then Secretary of State for Transport, Barbara Castle.

Passenger levels decreased steadily from 1962 to the late 1970s, and reached a low in 1982. Network improvements included completing electrification of the Great Eastern Main Line from London to Norwich between 1976 and 1986 and the East Coast Main Line from London to Edinburgh between 1985 and 1990. A mainline route closure during this period of relative network stability was the -electrified Woodhead line between Manchester and Sheffield: passenger service ceased in 1970 and goods in 1981.

The 1980s and 1990s saw the closure of some railways which had survived the Beeching cuts a generation earlier but which had seen passenger services withdrawn. This included the bulk of the Chester and Connah's Quay Railway in 1992, the Brierley Hill to Walsall section of the South Staffordshire line in 1993, while the Birmingham to Wolverhampton section of the Great Western Railway was closed in three phases between 1972 and 1992.

A further British Rail report from a committee chaired by Sir David Serpell was published in 1983. The Serpell Report made no recommendations as such but did set out various options for the network, including, at their most extreme, a skeletal system of less than 2,000routekm (1,240miles). This report was not welcomed, and the government decided to quietly leave it on the shelf. Meanwhile, BR was gradually reorganised, with the regional structure finally being abolished and replaced with business-led sectors. This process, known as "sectorisation", led to far greater customer focus on the dedicated sectors.

Transport Act 1968 

Following the election of Labour in 1964, on a platform of revising many of the cuts, Tom Fraser instead authorised the closure 1,071 mi of railway lines, following the recommendations from the Beeching Report even lines not considered closing. After he resigned in 1967, his replacement Barbara Castle continued the line and station closures but introduced the first Government rail subsidies for socially necessary but unprofitable railways in the Transport Act 1968. Part of these provisions was the creation of a passenger transport executive or PTE within larger metropolitan areas. Prior to this, public transport was run by individual local authorities and private companies, with little co-ordination. The PTEs took over the responsibility (but not ownership) of managing local rail networks.

The 1968 Act created five new bodies. These were:

 West Midlands PTE on 1 October 1969
 SELNEC PTE (South East Lancashire & North East Cheshire) on 1 November 1969 (now Greater Manchester)
 Merseyside PTE on 1 December 1969 (now Liverpool City Region)
 Tyneside PTE on 1 January 1970 (now Tyne and Wear)
 Greater Glasgow PTE on 1 June 1973 (now Strathclyde)

This was the first real subdivision of BR since its inception in 1949, and likely saved many lines earmarked for closure, notably the Liverpool, Crosby and Southport Railway, which now forms part of the Merseyrail network.

Sectorisation 

Upon sectorisation in 1982, three passenger sectors were created: InterCity, operating principal express services; London & South East (renamed Network SouthEast in 1986) operating commuter services in the London area; Provincial (renamed Regional Railways in 1989) responsible for all other passenger services. In the metropolitan counties local services were managed by the Passenger Transport Executives. Provincial was the most subsidised (per passenger km) of the three sectors; upon formation, its costs were four times its revenue. During the 1980s British Rail ran the Rail Riders membership club aimed at 5- to 15-year-olds.

Because British Railways was such a large operation, running not just railways but also ferries, steamships and hotels, it has been considered difficult to analyse the effects of nationalisation.

Prices rose quickly in this period, rising 108% in real terms from 1979 to 1994, as prices rose by 262% but RPI only increased by 154% in the same time.

Branding

Pre-1960s 
Following nationalisation in 1948, British Railways began to adapt the corporate liveries on the rolling stock it had inherited from its predecessor railway companies. Initially, an express blue (followed by GWR-style Brunswick green in 1952) was used on passenger locomotives, and LNWR-style lined black for mixed-traffic locomotives, but later green was more widely adopted.

Development of a corporate identity for the organisation was hampered by the competing ambitions of the British Transport Commission and the Railway Executive. The Executive attempted to introduce a modern Art Deco-style curved logo, which could also serve as the standard for station signage totems. BR eventually adopted the common branding of the BTC as its first corporate logo, a lion astride a spoked wheel, designed for the BTC by Cecil Thomas; on the bar overlaid across the wheel, the BTC's name was replaced with the words "British Railways". This logo, nicknamed the "Cycling Lion", was applied from 1948 to 1956 to the sides of locomotives, while the oval style was adopted for station signs across Great Britain, each coloured according to the appropriate BR region, using the Gill Sans font first adopted by LNER in 1923.

In 1956, the BTC was granted a heraldic achievement by the College of Arms and the Lord Lyon, and then BTC chairman Brian Robertson wanted a grander logo for the railways. BR's second corporate logo (1956–1965), designed in consultation with Charles Franklyn, adapted the original, depicting a rampant lion emerging from a heraldic crown and holding a spoked wheel, all enclosed in a roundel with the "British Railways" name displayed across a bar on either side. This emblem soon acquired the nickname of the "Ferret and Dartboard". A variant of the logo with the name in a circle was also used on locomotives.

1960s 

The zeal for modernisation in the Beeching era drove the next rebranding exercise, and BR management wished to divest the organisation of anachronistic, heraldic motifs and develop a corporate identity to rival that of London Transport. BR's design panel set up a working party led by Milner Gray of the Design Research Unit. They drew up a Corporate Identity Manual which established a coherent brand and design standard for the whole organisation, specifying Rail Blue and pearl grey as the standard colour scheme for all rolling stock; Rail Alphabet as the standard corporate typeface, designed by Jock Kinneir and Margaret Calvert; and introducing the now-iconic corporate Identity Symbol of the Double Arrow logo. Designed by Gerald Barney (also of the DRU), this arrow device was formed of two interlocked arrows across two parallel lines, symbolising a double-track railway. It was likened to a bolt of lightning or barbed wire, and also acquired a nickname: "the arrow of indecision". A mirror image of the double arrow was used on the port side of BR-owned Sealink ferry funnels. The new BR corporate identity and Double Arrow were rolled out in 1965, and the brand name of the organisation was truncated to "British Rail". It is now employed as a generic symbol on street signs in Great Britain denoting railway stations, and is still printed on railway tickets as part of the Rail Delivery Group's jointly managed National Rail brand.

Post-1960s 

The uniformity of BR branding continued until the process of sectorisation was introduced in the 1980s. Certain BR operations such as Inter-City, Network SouthEast, Regional Railways or Rail Express Systems began to adopt their own identities, introducing logos and colour schemes which were essentially variants of the British Rail brand. Eventually, as sectorisation developed into a prelude to privatisation, the unified British Rail brand disappeared, with the notable exception of the Double Arrow symbol, which has survived to this day and serves as a generic trademark to denote railway services across Great Britain. The BR Corporate Identity Manual is noted as a piece of British design history and there are plans for it to be re-published.

Network

Regions 
With its creation in 1948, British Railways was divided into regions which were initially based on the areas the former Big Four operated in; later, several lines were transferred between regions. Notably, these included the former Great Central lines from the Eastern Region to the London Midland Region, and the West of England Main Line from the Southern Region to Western Region
 Southern Region: former Southern Railway lines.
 Western Region: former Great Western Railway lines.
 London Midland Region: former London Midland and Scottish Railway lines in England and Wales.
 Eastern Region: former London and North Eastern Railway lines south of York.
 Anglia Region: split from Eastern Region in 1988.
 North Eastern Region: former London and North Eastern Railway lines in England north of York.
 Scottish Region: all lines, regardless of the original company, in Scotland.

The North Eastern Region was merged with the Eastern Region in 1967.

Sectorisation 

In 1982, the regions were abolished as the service provider (but retained for administration) and replaced by "business sectors", a process known as sectorisation.

The passenger sectors were (by the early 1990s):
 InterCity (express services).
 Caledonian sleeper services (Night train services) (later transferred to ScotRail).
 Gatwick Express (express service to/from Gatwick airport)
 Network SouthEast (London commuter services).
 Regional Railways (regional services).
 Alphaline (enhanced regional express passenger services) (Added in 1994)
 ScotRail (regional and sub-intercity services in Scotland).
 TransPennine Express (sub-intercity services in the North).

In addition, the non-passenger sectors were: 
 Trainload Freight took trainload freight. 
 Railfreight Distribution took non-trainload freight. 
 Freightliner took intermodal traffic. 
 Rail Express Systems took parcels traffic.

The maintenance and remaining engineering works were split off into a new company, British Rail Maintenance Limited. The new sectors were further subdivided into divisions.

This ended the BR blue period as new liveries were adopted gradually. Infrastructure remained the responsibility of the regions until the "Organisation for Quality" initiative in 1991 when this too was transferred to the sectors. The Anglia Region was created in late 1987, its first General Manager being John Edmonds, who began his appointment on 19 October 1987. Full separation from the Eastern Region – apart from engineering design needs – occurred on 29 April 1988.

The former BR network, with the trunk routes of the West Coast Main Line, East Coast Main Line, Great Western Main Line, Great Eastern Main Line and Midland Main Line, and other lines.

Security 

Policing on (and within) the network was carried out British Transport Police (BTP). In 1947 the Transport Act created the British Transport Commission (BTC), which unified the railway system. On 1 January 1949, the British Transport Commission Police (BTCP) were created, formed from the four old railway police forces, the London Transport Police, canal police and several minor dock forces. In 1957 the Maxwell-Johnson enquiry found that policing requirements for the railway could not be met by civil forces and that it was essential that a specialist police force be retained. On 1 January 1962, the British Transport Commission Police ceased to cover British Waterways property and exactly a year later when the BTC was abolished the name of the force was amended to the British Transport Police. This name and its role within policing on the rail network was continued post-1994.

Finances 
Despite its nationalisation in 1947 "as one of the 'commanding heights' of the economy", according to some sources British Rail was not profitable for most (if not all) of its history. Newspapers reported that as recently as the 1990s, public rail subsidy was counted as profit; as early as 1961, British Railways were losing £300,000 a day.

Although the company was considered the sole public-transport option in many rural areas, the Beeching cuts made buses the only public transport available in some rural areas. Despite increases in traffic congestion and road fuel prices beginning to rise in the 1990s, British Rail remained unprofitable. Following sectorisation, InterCity became profitable. InterCity became one of Britain's top 150 companies, providing city centre to city centre travel across the nation from Aberdeen and Inverness in the north to Poole and Penzance in the south.

Investment 
In 1979 the incoming Conservative Government led by Margaret Thatcher was viewed as anti-railway, and did not want to commit public money to the railways. However, British Rail was allowed to spend its own money with government approval. This led to a number of electrification projects being given the go-ahead, including the East Coast Main Line, the spur from Doncaster to Leeds, and the lines in East Anglia out of London Liverpool Street to Norwich and King's Lynn. The list with approximate completion dates includes:
St Pancras – Bedford 1981–83
Rock Ferry – Hooton 1985
Hitchin – Leeds 1985–88
Colchester – Norwich 1986
Bishops Stortford – Cambridge 1987
Watford Junction – St Albans Abbey 1988
Royston – Cambridge 1988
Snow Hill Tunnel as part of Thameslink project 1988
Doncaster – York 1989
Airdrie – Drumgelloch 1989
York – Edinburgh Waverley (and the spur to North Berwick) 1991
Carstairs – Edinburgh Waverley 1991
Cambridge – King's Lynn 1992
Hooton – Ellesmere Port and Chester 1993–94
London Paddington – Heathrow Airport 1993–98
Leeds and Bradford Forster Square – Skipton and Ilkley 1994

In the Southwest, the South West Main Line from Bournemouth to Weymouth was electrified along with other infill  third rail electrification in the south. In 1988, the line to Aberdare was reopened. A British Rail advertisement ("Britain's Railway", directed by Hugh Hudson) featured some of the best-known railway structures in Britain, including the Forth Rail Bridge, Royal Albert Bridge, Glenfinnan Viaduct and London Paddington station. London Liverpool Street station was rebuilt, opened by Queen Elizabeth II, and a new station was constructed at Stansted Airport in 1991. The following year, the Maesteg line was reopened. In 1988, the Windsor Link Line, Manchester was constructed and has proven to be an important piece of infrastructure.

APTIS ticket 

Before the introduction of APTIS (Accountancy and Passenger Ticket Issuing System), British Rail used the Edmondson railway ticket, first introduced in the 1840s and phased out in the early 1970s. Tickets issued from British Rail's APTIS system had a considerable amount of information presented in a consistent, standard format. The design for all tickets was created by Colin Goodall. This format has formed the basis for all subsequent ticket issuing systems introduced on the railway network – ticket-office-based, self-service and conductor-operated machines alike. APTIS survived in widespread use for twenty years but, in the early 2000s, was largely replaced by more modern PC-based ticketing systems. Some APTIS machines in the Greater London area were modified as APTIS-ANT (with no obvious difference to the ticket issued) to make them Oyster card compatible. The last APTIS machines were removed at the end of 2006 as there was no option to upgrade them to accept Chip and PIN credit card payments. The last APTIS-ANT ticket to be issued in the UK using one of the machines was at Upminster station on 21 March 2007.

Before the rail network was privatised, British Rail introduced several discount cards through the APTIS that were available to certain demographics, issued either by National or Regional schemes:

16–25 Railcard
The Network Railcard, introduced in 1986 by British Rail upon the creation of their Network SouthEast sector in parts of Southern England
Disabled Persons Railcard, introduced in 1981 to coincide with the International Year of Disabled Persons.
Senior Railcard, introduced in 1970.

Privatisation 

In 1989, the narrow-gauge Vale of Rheidol Railway was preserved, becoming the first part of British Rail to be privatised.
Between 1994 and 1997, British Rail was privatised. Ownership of the track and infrastructure passed to Railtrack on 1 April 1994. Passenger operations were later franchised to 25 private-sector operators. Of the six freight companies, five were sold to Wisconsin Central to form EWS while Freightliner was sold in a management buyout.

The Waterloo & City line, part of Network SouthEast, was not included in the privatisation and was transferred to London Underground in April 1994. The remaining obligations of British Rail were transferred to BRB (Residuary) Limited.

The privatisation, proposed by the Conservative government in 1992, was opposed by the Labour Party and the rail unions. Although Labour initially proposed to reverse privatisation, the New Labour manifesto of 1997 instead opposed Conservative plans to privatise the London Underground. Rail unions have historically opposed privatisation, but former Associated Society of Locomotive Engineers and Firemen general secretary Lew Adams moved to work for Virgin Rail Group, and said on a 2004 radio phone-in programme: "All the time it was in the public sector, all we got were cuts, cuts, cuts. And today, there are more members in the trade union, more train drivers, and more trains running. The reality is that it worked, we’ve protected jobs, and we got more jobs."

The privatisation process began when BR's passenger sectors were divided into 25 shadow franchises – these were publicly owned TOCs operating in the planned franchise areas prior to the actual franchises being put to tender:

The opening of the Channel Tunnel saw operations by Eurostar begin from London Waterloo to Paris and Brussels.

Accidents and incidents

Preserved lines 

The narrow-gauge Vale of Rheidol Railway in Ceredigion, Wales, became part of British Railways at nationalisation. Although built as a working railway, in 1948 the line was principally a tourist attraction. British Rail operated the line using steam locomotives long after the withdrawal of standard-gauge steam. The line's three steam locomotives were the only ones to receive TOPS serial numbers and be painted in BR Rail Blue livery with the double arrow logo. The Vale of Rheidol Railway was privatised in 1989 and continues to operate as a private heritage railway.

Other preserved lines, or heritage railways, have reopened lines previously closed by British Rail. These range from picturesque rural branch lines like the Keighley and Worth Valley Railway to sections of mainline such as the Great Central Railway.

Although most are operated solely as leisure amenities, some also provide educational resources, and a few have ambitions to restore commercial services over routes abandoned by the nationalised industry.

Marine services

Ships 

British Railways operated ships from its formation in 1948 on several routes. Many ships were acquired on nationalisation, and others were built for operation by British Railways or its later subsidiary, Sealink. Those ships capable of carrying rail vehicles were classed under TOPS as Class 99.

Sealink 

Sealink was originally the brand name for the ferry services of British Rail in the United Kingdom and Ireland. Services to France, Belgium, and the Netherlands were run by Sealink UK as part of the Sealink consortium, which also used ferries owned by French national railways (SNCF), the Belgian Maritime Transport Authority Regie voor Maritiem Transport/Regie des transports maritimes (RMT/RTM) and the Dutch Stoomvaart Maatschappij Zeeland (Zeeland Steamship Company).

Historically, the shipping services were exclusively an extension of the railways across the English Channel and the Irish Sea in order to provide through, integrated services to mainland Europe and Ireland. As international travel became more popular in the late 1960s and before air travel became generally affordable, the responsibility for shipping services was taken away from the British Rail Regions and, in 1969, centralised in a new division – British Rail Shipping and International Services Division.

With the advent of car ferry services, the old passenger-only ferries were gradually replaced by roll-on/roll-off ships, catering for motorists and rail passengers as well as road freight. However, given that there was now competition in the form of other ferry companies offering crossings to motorists, it became necessary to market the services in a normal business fashion (as opposed to the previous almost monopolistic situation). Thus, with the other partners mentioned above, the brand name Sealink was introduced for the consortium.

In the late 1960s, as demand for international rail travel declined and the shipping business became almost exclusively dependent on passenger and freight vehicle traffic, the ferry business was incorporated as Sealink UK Limited on 1 January 1979, a wholly owned subsidiary of the British Railways Board, but still part of the Sealink consortium. In 1979, Sealink acquired Manx Line, which offered services to the Isle of Man from Heysham.

On 27 July 1984, the UK Government sold Sealink UK to Sea Containers for £66million. The company was renamed Sealink British Ferries. The sale excluded the operations of Hoverspeed, the Isle of Wight services and the share in the Isle of Man Steam Packet Company, as well as the Port of Heysham. In 1996, the Sealink name disappeared when the UK services, by then owned by Stena, were re-branded as Stena Line. The agreement with the SNCF on the Dover to Calais route also ended at this time, and the French-run Sealink services were rebranded as SeaFrance.

Hovercraft 

The joint hovercraft services of British Rail in association with the French SNCF. British Rail Hovercraft Limited was established in 1965, under authority given to it by the British Railways Act 1967 and started its first service in 1966. Sea speed started cross-Channel services from Dover to Calais and Boulogne-sur-Mer, France using SR-N4 hovercraft in August 1968.

British Rail Engineering Limited 

Incorporated on 31 October 1969, British Rail Engineering Limited (BREL) was a wholly owned railway systems engineering subsidiary of the British Railways Board. Created through the Transport Act 1968, to manage BR's thirteen workshops, it replaced the British Rail Workshops Division, which had existed since 1948. The works managed by BREL were Ashford, Crewe, Derby Locomotive Works, Derby Litchurch Lane, Doncaster, Eastleigh, Glasgow, Horwich Foundry, Shildon, Swindon, Temple Mills, Wolverton and York. BREL began trading in January 1970. In 1989 BREL was sold to a consortium of Asea Brown Boveri and Trafalgar House.

Mark 2 carriages 

A family of railway carriages designed and built by British Rail workshops (from 1969 British Rail Engineering Limited) between 1964 and 1975. They were of steel construction.

Advanced Passenger Train 

In the 1970s, British Rail developed tilting train technology in the Advanced Passenger Train; there had been earlier experiments and prototypes in other countries, notably Italy. The objective of the tilt was to minimise the discomfort to passengers caused by taking the curves of the West Coast Main Line at high speed. The APT also had hydrokinetic brakes, which enabled the train to stop from 150 mph within existing signal spacings.

The introduction into service of the Advanced Passenger Train was to be a three-stage project. Phase 1, the development of an experimental APT (APT-E), was completed. This used a gas turbine-electric locomotive, the only multiple unit so powered that was used by British Rail. It was formed of two power cars (numbers PC1 and PC2), initially with nothing between them and later, two trailer cars (TC1 and TC2). The cars were made of aluminium to reduce the weight of the unit and were articulated. The gas turbine was dropped from development due to excessive noise and the high fuel costs of the late 1970s. The APT-E first ran on 25 July 1971. The train drivers' union, ASLEF, black-listed the train due to its use of a single driver. The train was moved to Derby (with the aid of a locomotive inspector). This triggered a one-day strike by ASLEF that cost BR more than the research budget for the entire year.

Phase 2, the introduction of three prototype trains (APT-P) into revenue service on the Glasgow – London Euston route, did occur. Originally, there were to have been eight APT-P sets running, with minimal differences between them and the main fleet. However, financial constraints led to only three being authorised after two years of discussion by the British Railways Board. The cost was split equally between the Board and the Ministry of Transport. After these delays, considerable pressure grew to put the APT-P into revenue-service before they were fully ready. This inevitably led to high-profile failures as a result of technical problems.

These failures led to the trains being withdrawn from service while the problems were ironed out. However, by this time, managerial and political support had evaporated. Consequently, phase 3, the introduction of the Squadron fleet (APT-S), did not occur, and the project ended in 1982.

Although the APT never properly entered service, the experience gained enabled the construction of other high-speed trains. The APT powercar technology was imported without the tilt into the design of the Class 91 locomotives, and the tilting technology was incorporated into Italian State Railway's Pendolino trains, which first entered service in 1987.

InterCity 125 

The InterCity 125, or High-Speed Train, was a diesel-powered passenger train built by British Rail Engineering Limited between 1975 and 1982 that was credited with saving British Rail. Each set is made up of two Class 43 power cars, one at each end and four to nine Mark 3 carriages.

This was succeeded by a production set reaching  in November 1987.

Sprinters

 By the early 1980s British Rail operated a large fleet of first generation DMUs, which had been constructed in prior decades to various designs. While formulating its long-term strategy for this sector of its operations, British Rail planners recognised that there would be considerable costs incurred by undertaking refurbishment programmes necessary for the continued use of these ageing multiple units, particularly due to the necessity of handling and removing hazardous materials such as asbestos. In light of the high costs involved in retention, planners examined the prospects for the development and introduction of a new generation of DMUs to succeed the first generation.

In 1984/1985, two experimental DMU designs were put into service: the British Rail Engineering Limited built Class 150 and Metro-Cammell built Class 151. Both of these used hydraulic transmission and were less bus-like than the Pacers. After trials, Class 150 was selected for production, entering service from 1987. Reliability was much improved by the new units, with depot visits being reduced from two or three times a week to fortnightly.

The late 1980s and early 1990s also saw the development of secondary express services that complemented the mainline Intercity routes. Class 155 and Class 156 Sprinters were developed to replace locomotive-hauled trains on these services, their interiors being designed with longer distance journeys in mind. Key Scottish and Trans-Pennine routes were upgraded with new Class 158 Express Sprinters, while a network of 'Alphaline' services was introduced elsewhere in the country.

By the end of the 1980s, passenger numbers had increased and costs had been reduced to two-and-a-half times revenue.

Successor companies 

Under the process of British Rail's privatisation, operations were split into 125 companies between 1994 and 1997. The ownership and operation of the infrastructure of the railway system was taken over by Railtrack. The telecommunications infrastructure and British Rail Telecommunications was sold to Racal, which in turn was sold to Global Crossing and merged with Thales Group. The rolling stock was transferred to three private rolling stock companies (ROSCOs); Angel Trains, Eversholt Rail Group and Porterbrook. Passenger services were divided into 25 operating companies, which were let on a franchise basis for a set period, whilst freight services were sold off completely. Dozens of smaller engineering and maintenance companies were also created and sold off.

British Rail's passenger services came to an end upon the franchising of ScotRail with the last service being a Caledonian Sleeper service from Glasgow and Edinburgh to London on 31 March 1997. The final service it operated was a Railfreight Distribution freight train from Dollands Moor to Wembley on 20 November 1997. The British Railways Board continued in existence as a corporation until early 2001, when it was replaced by the Strategic Rail Authority as part of the implementation of the Transport Act 2000.

The original passenger franchisees were:

Anglia Railways
Arriva Trains Merseyside
Arriva Trains Northern
Central Trains
Chiltern Railways
Connex South Central
Connex South Eastern
c2c
First Great Eastern
First Great Western
First North Western
Gatwick Express
GNER
Island Line
Midland Mainline
ScotRail
Silverlink
South West Trains
Thames Trains
Thameslink
Valley Lines
Virgin CrossCountry
Virgin Trains West Coast
WAGN
Wales & West

Future 

Since privatisation, many groups have campaigned for the renationalisation of UK Rail services, most notably 'Bring Back British Rail'. Various interested parties also have views on the privatisation of British Rail.

The renationalisation of the railways of Britain continues to have popular support. Polls in 2012 and 2013 showed 70% and 66% support for renationalisation, respectively.

Due to rail franchises sometimes lasting over a decade, full renationalisation would take years unless compensation was paid to terminate contracts early.

When the infrastructure-owning company Railtrack ceased trading in 2002, the Labour government set up the not-for-dividend company Network Rail to take over the duties rather than renationalise this part of the network. However, in September 2014, Network Rail was reclassified as a central government body, adding around £34 billion to public sector net debt. This reclassification had been requested by the Office for Budget Responsibility to comply with pan-European accounting standard ESA10.

The Green party has committed to bringing the railways 'back into public ownership' and has maintained this impetus when other parties argued to maintain the status quo. In 2016, Green MP, Caroline Lucas, put forward a Bill that would have seen the rail network fall back into public ownership step by step, as franchises come up for expiry.

Under Jeremy Corbyn (2015–2020), the Labour Party pledged to gradually renationalise British Rail franchises if elected, as and when their private contracts expire, creating a "People's Railway". In a pledge during his successful leadership campaign to succeed Corbyn, Keir Starmer said that renationalising rail would remain as Labour Party policy under his leadership. Following the COVID-19 pandemic decimating franchise revenues and making them unviable, in 2021 the government announced it would take back responsibility for the operations of passenger services through Great British Railways with service provision to be contracted to private operators.

Parodies 
In 1989, the ITV sketch show Spitting Image parodied Hugh Hudson's 1988 British Rail, Britain's Railway advert on the plans of the then Conservative British Government to privatise the railways featuring many of the show's puppets (including the show's portrayal of Prime Minister Margaret Thatcher), numerous BR trains and landmarks and even a cardboard cutout of Thomas the Tank Engine.

See also

History
History of rail transport in Great Britain
Impact of the privatisation of British Rail

Divisions, brands and liveries
British Rail brand names
British Rail corporate liveries
List of companies operating trains in the United Kingdom

Classification and numbering schemes
British carriage and wagon numbering and classification
British Rail locomotive and multiple unit numbering and classification
List of British Rail classes

Rolling stock
List of British Railways steam locomotives as of 31 December 1967
List of LMS locomotives as of 31 December 1947
List of LNER locomotives as of 31 December 1947

Other
British Rail flying saucer
British Rail sandwich
British Transport Films
British Transport Police
Channel Tunnel
National Association of Railway Clubs
Rail transport in Great Britain
The wrong type of snow

References

Further reading 
 , on nationalization 1945–50, pp 236–83
Smith, Lewis Charles. "Marketing modernity: Business and family in British Rail’s “Age of the Train” campaign, 1979–84." The Journal of Transport History 40.3 (2019): 363–394.

External links 

 British Railways Board history
 BRB (Residuary) Ltd.
 Catalogue of the BR Technical Research Department archives, held at the Modern Records Centre, University of Warwick

 
British companies established in 1948
Defunct railway companies of the United Kingdom
Former nationalised industries of the United Kingdom
Railway companies established in 1948
Railway companies disestablished in 1997
1948 establishments in the United Kingdom
1997 disestablishments in the United Kingdom